David Mark Haddleton (born 1962) is a professor in the Department of Chemistry at The University of Warwick. Haddleton’s work focuses on controlled polymer synthesis and the industrial applications of polymer materials. He is a Fellow of the Royal Society of Chemistry.

Biography 
Haddleton was born in Longbridge, Birmingham, UK in 1962 and educated at King Edward VI Camp Hill School for boys in Kings Heath, Birmingham. He studied Chemistry to BSc at the University of York and was awarded a Second Class Division 1 degree (2i) in 1983.  
Haddleton received his D.Phil. from the University of York in 1986, working under the supervision of  Professor Robin Perutz. His thesis focused on the photochemistry of metal ethene complexes for the purposes of methane activation using a combination of matrix isolation, flash photolysis and solution photochemistry. Haddleton was an ICI funded postdoctoral research fellow at the University of Toronto in 1987 involved in metal vapour synthesis and zeolite encapsulation with Professor Geoff Ozin. He then joined the company ICI and spent one year at the University of Southern Mississippi, US with Professor Anselm Griffin prior to 5 years as a Scientist in the ICI corporate polymer group in Runcorn, UK. He then joined the University of Warwick as a Lecturer in Polymer Synthesis and Catalysis in 1993 being promoted to Professor in 1998. Haddleton has worked in the area of polymer synthesis graduating over 80 PhD students and publishing over 400 articles and is named inventor on over 15 patents. He featured as a Thomson Reuters ISI Highly Cited author in 2018.

Haddleton was Editor in Chief of the European Polymer Journal from 2002 – 2009 prior to becoming the Founding Editor and Editor in Chief of the Royal Society of Chemistry Polymer Chemistry from 2009 – 2017. He now sits on the Royal Society of Chemistry Publishing Board. 
His research has been closely aligned with a number of companies including Unilever, Lubrizol and Syngenta. He has founded two companies Warwick Effect Polymers Ltd (now part of Abzena) a drug-polymer conjugation company and Medherant Ltd which develops transdermal drug delivery patches and adhesives. He has been an adjunct Professor at Monash University in both the Departments of Materials Engineering and Pharmacy since 2013 and has been a Chair Professor at Soochow University in Suzhou, China.

Appointments 
 1987		PDRA, University of Toronto, Toronto, Canada (G A Ozin)

 1988 - 1993	ICI/Zeneca Senior Research Scientist

 1988		University of Southern Mississippi, Hattiesburg, MS, USA (A C Griffin)

 1993 - 1996	Lecturer, University of Warwick, Coventry, UK

 1996 - 1998	Senior Lecturer, University of Warwick, Coventry, UK

 1998 - Current		Professor of Chemistry, University of Warwick, Coventry, UK

 2001 - 2011	CEO/CTO and Founder, Warwick Effect Polymers Ltd

 2013 - Current		Adjunct Professor, Monash University (Pharmacy and Materials Engineering)

 2014 - Current		Founder of Medherant Ltd, Executive Director and CSO

 2014 - 2017	Chair Professor Soochow University, Suzhou, China

Selected publications 
1.	Ladmiral, V.; Mantovani, G.; Clarkson, G. J.; Cauet, S.; Irwin, J. L.; Haddleton, D. M., Synthesis of neoglycopolymers by a combination of "click chemistry" and living radical polymerization. Journal of the American Chemical Society 2006, 128 (14), 4823-4830. https://doi.org/10.1021/ja058364k

2.	Mantovani, G.; Lecolley, F.; Tao, L.; Haddleton, D. M.; Clerx, J.; Cornelissen, J.; Velonia, K., Design and synthesis of N-maleimido-functionalized hydrophilic polymers via copper-mediated living radical polymerization: A suitable alternative to PEGylation chemistry. Journal of the American Chemical Society 2005, 127 (9), 2966-2973. https://doi.org/10.1021/ja0430999

3.	Ryan, S. M.; Mantovani, G.; Wang, X. X.; Haddleton, D. M.; Brayden, D. J., Advances in PEGylation of important biotech molecules: delivery aspects. Expert Opinion on Drug Delivery 2008, 5 (4), 371-383. https://doi.org/10.1517/17425247.5.4.371

4.	Tao, L.; Mantovani, G.; Lecolley, F.; Haddleton, D. M., α-Aldehyde terminally functional methacrylic polymers from living radical polymerization: Application in protein conjugation "pegylation". Journal of the American Chemical Society 2004, 126 (41), 13220-13221. https://doi.org/10.1021/ja0456454

5.	Zhang, Q.; Wilson, P.; Li, Z. D.; McHale, R.; Godfrey, J.; Anastasaki, A.; Waldron, C.; Haddleton, D. M., Aqueous Copper-Mediated Living Polymerization: Exploiting Rapid Disproportionation of CuBr with Me6TREN. Journal of the American Chemical Society 2013, 135 (19), 7355-7363. https://doi.org/10.1021/ja4026402

6.	Haddleton, D. M.; Jasieczek, C. B.; Hannon, M. J.; Shooter, A. J., Atom transfer radical polymerization of methyl methacrylate initiated by alkyl bromide and 2-pyridinecarbaldehyde imine copper(I) complexes. Macromolecules 1997, 30 (7), 2190-2193. https://doi.org/10.1021/ma961074r

7.	Anastasaki, A.; Nikolaou, V.; Nurumbetov, G.; Wilson, P.; Kempe, K.; Quinn, J. F.; Davis, T. P.; Whittaker, M. R.; Haddleton, D. M., Cu(0)-Mediated Living Radical Polymerization: A Versatile Tool for Materials Synthesis. Chemical Reviews 2016, 116 (3), 835-877. https://doi.org/10.1021/acs.chemrev.5b00191

8.	Davis, T. P.; Kukulj, D.; Haddleton, D. M.; Maloney, D. R., Cobalt-Mediated Free-Radical Polymerisation of Acrylic-Monomers. Trends in Polymer Science 1995, 3 (11), 365-373. https://www.scopus.com/record/display.uri?eid=2-s2.0-0001042297&origin=inward&txGid=a854b72ffb71b1d10ed6a7e96b904cca

9.	Engelis, N. G.; Anastasaki, A.; Nurumbetov, G.; Truong, N. P.; Nikolaou, V.; Shegiwal, A.; Whittaker, M. R.; Davis, T. P.; Haddleton, D. M., Sequence-controlled methacrylic multiblock copolymers via sulfur-free RAFT emulsion polymerization. Nature Chemistry 2017, 9 (2), 171-178. https://doi.org/10.1038/nchem.2634

External links 
 David Haddleton’s Warwick University homepage
 David Haddleton publications indexed by Google Scholar

References 

Academics of the University of Warwick
British chemists
Alumni of the University of York

1962 births
Living people